Mbongeni Gumede (born 11 September 1993) is a South African soccer player who plays as a right-back for South African Premier Division side AmaZulu.

Career
Born in Durban, Gumede started his career at Orlando Pirates before joining Jomo Cosmos on a loan until the end of the season in January 2013. Gumede joined AmaZulu in the summer of 2015 on a season-long loan, before joining the club on a permanent basis the following summer.

Personal life
In 2015, Gumede was involved in a car accident alongside team-mate Tshepo Liphoko.

References

1993 births
Living people
South African soccer players
Sportspeople from Durban
Association football fullbacks
Orlando Pirates F.C. players
Jomo Cosmos F.C. players
AmaZulu F.C. players
South African Premier Division players